Ofe or OFE may refer to:

 Ofe, in African American Vernacular English, a Yoruban pejorative for a white person
 Ofè, Collines, Benin (West Africa)
 Öfe, Turkish exonym for Ufa, Bashkortostan, Russia
 Office of Financial Education, office in the Office of Financial Institutions agency of the United States Department of Treasury
 Office of Financial Enforcement, United States Department of Treasury office that merged with the Financial Crimes Enforcement Network in 1994
 Old Friends Equine, equine (horse) retirement facility in Kentucky, USA
 OpenForum Europe, an open source software and open standards advocacy organisation
 Open Front End, interface for the Kodak prepress printing Approval proofer
 Opera For Everyone, program of the Hawaii Opera Theatre
 Operation Flying Eagle, humanitarian military operation for the 2005 Sumatra earthquake
 Owner Furnished Equipment (Industry Term)
 Oxygen-free electronic, type of oxygen-free copper

See also
 
 Ofe Owerri, 1994 Nigerian music album by Dr Sir Warrior
 Ofe Owerri, Nigerian food
 OF (disambiguation)
 OE (disambiguation)